Victor Henri-Joseph Brahain du Cange (or Ducange) (November 24, 1783October 15, 1833) was a French novelist and dramatist, born at the Hague, where his father was secretary to the French embassy.

Dismissed from the civil service at the Restoration, Ducange became one of the favorite authors of the liberal party, and owed some part of his popularity to the fact that he was fined and imprisoned more than once for his outspokenness.

Many of his books were prohibited, ostensibly for their coarseness, but perhaps rather for their political tendencies. He died in Paris.

Works 
Theatre
1813: Palmerin, ou le Solitaire des Gaules, in three acts
1813: Pharamond, ou l’Entrée des Francs dans les Gaules, in three acts
1818: Le Prince de Norvège, ou la Bague de fer, in three acts
1819: Le Prisonnier vénitien, in three acts, with Dupetit-Méré
1819: Calas, in three acts
1819: La Tante à marier, one-act comédie en vaudeville 
1819: La Maison du Corrégidor, ou Ruse et malice, in three acts
1820: Le Colonel et le Soldat, in three acts
1820: Thérèse, ou l’Orpheline de Genève, in three acts
1821: La Suédoise, in three acts
1822: Élodie, ou la Vierge du monastère, in three acts
1823: Lisbeth, in three acts
1824: Les Diamants, in three acts
1826: Mac Doivell, in three acts
1826: Trente ans, ou la Vie d’un joueur
1828: Polder, ou le Bourreau d’Amsterdam, with Pixérécourt, in three acts
1828: La Fiancée de Lammermoor, in three acts
1829: Sept heures ou Charlotte Corday, three-act melodrama with Auguste Anicet-Bourgeois, Théâtre de la Porte-Saint-Martin
1830: Le Jésuite, with Pixérécourt, en trois actes 
1831: La Vendetta, ou la Fiancée corse, in three acts
1831: Il y a seize ans, in three acts
1831: l’Oiseau bleu, with Simonnin, two-act féerie

Novels
1819: Agathe, ou le Petit Vieillard de Calais, Paris, 2 vol. in-12°
1820: Albert, ou les Amants missionnaires, 2 vol. in-12°
1820: Valentine ou le Pasteur d'Uzès, (this work in which he condemned the massacres of 1815, earned him seven months in jail.)
1823: Léonide, ou la Vieille de Suresnes, 5 vol. in-12°
1825: La Luthérienne, 6 vol. in-12°
1825: Le Médecin confesseur, 6 vol. in-12°
1826: Les Trois Filles de la Veuve, 6 vol. in-12°
1827: L’Artiste et le Soldat, 5 vol, in-12°
1830: Isaurine, 5 vol. in-12°
1830: Ludovica, 6 vol. in-12°
1832: Marc Loricot, 6 vol. in-12°
1834: Les Mœurs, tales and short stories, 2 vol. in-12°
1835: Joasine, ou la Fille du prêtre, 5 vol, in-12°

References

External links 
 Victor Ducange on Data.bnf.fr

1783 births
1833 deaths
19th-century French novelists
19th-century French dramatists and playwrights
French male novelists
19th-century French male writers
French expatriates in the Dutch Republic